The phrase "life unworthy of life" was a Nazi designation for the segments of the populace which, according to the Nazi regime, had no right to live. Those individuals were targeted to be murdered by the state ("euthanized"), usually through the compulsion or deception of their caretakers. The term included people with serious medical problems and those considered grossly inferior according to the racial policy of Nazi Germany. This concept formed an important component of the ideology of Nazism and eventually helped lead to the Holocaust. It is similar to but more restrictive than the concept of Untermensch, subhumans, as not all "subhumans" were considered unworthy of life (Slavs, for instance, were deemed useful for slave labor).

The "euthanasia" program was officially adopted in 1939 and came through the personal decision of Adolf Hitler. It grew in extent and scope from Aktion T4 ending officially in 1941 when public protests stopped the program, through the Action 14f13 against concentration camp inmates. The "euthanasia" of certain cultural and religious groups and those with physical and mental disabilities continued more discreetly until the end of World War II. The methods used initially at German hospitals such as lethal injections and bottled gas poisoning were expanded to form the basis for the creation of extermination camps where cyanide gas chambers were purpose-built to facilitate the extermination of the Jews, Romani, communists, anarchists, and political dissidents.

History
The expression first appeared in print via the title of a 1920 book, Die Freigabe der Vernichtung Lebensunwerten Lebens (Allowing the Destruction of Life Unworthy of Life) by two professors, the jurist Karl Binding (retired from the University of Leipzig) and psychiatrist Alfred Hoche from the University of Freiburg.  According to Hoche, some living people who were brain damaged, intellectually disabled, autistic (though not recognized as such at the time), and psychiatrically ill were "mentally dead", "human ballast" and "empty shells of human beings". Hoche believed that killing such people was useful. Some people were simply considered disposable. Later the killing was extended to people considered 'racially impure' or 'racially inferior' according to Nazi thinking.

The concept culminated in Nazi extermination camps, instituted to systematically murder those who were unworthy to live according to Nazi ideologists. It also justified various human experimentation and eugenics programs, as well as Nazi racial policies.

Development of the concept

According to the author of Medical Killing and the Psychology of Genocide psychiatrist Robert Jay Lifton, the policy went through a number of iterations and modifications:
{{quote|Of the five identifiable steps by which the Nazis carried out the principle of "life unworthy of life," coercive sterilization was the first. There followed the killing of "impaired" children in hospitals; and then the killing of "impaired" adults, mostly collected from mental hospitals, in centers especially equipped with carbon monoxide gas. This project was extended (in the same killing centers) to "impaired" inmates of concentration and extermination camps and, finally, to mass killings in the extermination camps themselves.}}

See also
 Aktion T4''
 Nazi concentration camp badges
 Holocaust victims
 Department of Film (Nazi Germany)
 Glossary of Nazi Germany: Useless eaters
 Nazi eugenics
 Nazism and race
 Sagamihara stabbings
 Social cleansing
 Am Spiegelgrund clinic

References

External links
 "Life Unworthy of Life" and other Medical Killing Programmes by Dr. Stuart D. Stein, University of the West of England
 Contemporary English translation of "Allowing the Destruction of Life Unworthy of life" by Dr. Cristina Modak
 German text online of Die Freigabe der Vernichtung Lebensunwerten Lebens

The Holocaust in Germany
Nazi eugenics
Nazi terminology
Holocaust terminology